A kholop was a type of feudal serf in Kievan Rus', then in Russia between the 10th and early 18th centuries. Their legal status was close to that of slaves.

Etymology 
The word kholop was first mentioned in a chronicle for the year of 986. The word is cognate with Slavic words translated as "man" or "boy" (modern Ukrainian: хлопець (khlopets), Polish: chłopiec, Bulgarian: хлапе/хлапак). Chlap/chlop (pronounced khlap/khlop) is a synonym for "man" in Slovak (chlapec thus being the diminutive). Such transitions between the meanings "young person" and "servant" (in both directions) are commonplace, as evident from the English use of "boy" in the sense of "domestic servant".

Kholops 

The Russkaya Pravda, a legal code of the late Kievan Rus, details the status and types of kholops of the time.

In the 11th–12th centuries, the term referred to different categories of dependent people and especially slaves. A kholops master had unlimited power over his life, e.g., he could kill him, sell him, or pay his way out of debt with him. The master, however, was responsible for a kholops  actions, such as insulting a freeman or stealing.

A person could become a kholop as a result of capture, selling oneself, being sold for debts, after having committed crimes, or through marriage to a kholop. Until the late 15th century, the kholops represented a majority among the servants, who had been working lordly lands. Some kholops, mainly house serfs, replenished the ranks of the princely servants (including those in the military) or engaged themselves in trades, farming, or administrative activities.

Throughout the 16th century, the role of the kholops in the corvée economy had been diminishing due to the increasing involvement of peasant exploitation (see Russian serfdom). At the turn of the 16th century, the service class kholops (служилое холопство, sluzhiloye kholopstvo) began to emerge and spread across the country. In the late 17th century, there were also kholops "chained" to their land (посаженные на землю, posazhenniye na zemlyu), who took care of their own household and had to pay quitrent. Those kholops, who had been house serfs, were subject to poll tax in 1722–1724 and were thereafter treated as ordinary serfs.

Combat servants 
"Combat servants", also known as "military slaves" in literature, constituted an armed retinue and personal protection for large and medium-sized landowners in the 16th-18th centuries, and carried out military service together with noblemen, constituting a considerable part of the "Landed Army". They were equipped as mounted archers, usually wearing cheap quilted armor and caps.

References

Society of Kievan Rus'
Economy of the Russian Empire
Feudalism in Russia